Lily May Loveless (born 16 April 1990) is an English actress, best known for her role as Naomi in the BAFTA award-winning drama Skins.

Career
Loveless made her acting debut in the third series of Skins, playing the sexually confused, outspoken political activist teenager Naomi Campbell.

Loveless was a performer in Psychotic Dance Company, a dance group that specialises in street dance fused with other urban dance styles. Loveless received the 2007 Jack Petchey Achievement Award. In June 2007, she performed with the Psychotic Dance Company at the Tottenham Carnival.

In 2010, she played the character of Chloe in the adaptation of Mark Billingham's Sleepyhead. Following this, Loveless secured many roles, including Anna in The Fades penned by former Skins writer, Jack Thorne (playing the role in both the pilot and the following series); Sadie in Sky Living's supernatural drama, Bedlam alongside Theo James, Charlotte Salt and former Skins co-stars Will Young and Hugo Speer; Bex in BBC children's drama Combat Kids; and an appearance as homeless teenage runaway, Ellie, in the final series of The Sarah Jane Adventures. She ended 2011 making her film debut in Nirpal Bhogal's Sket playing the part of Hannah. After its premiere at the London Film Festival, the film was released nationwide on 28 October 2011. She followed this with a guest appearance in the BBC drama, 'Good Cop', written by Stephen Butchard, and a role in Nihat Seven's independent film drama Candle to Water.

Outside film and television, Loveless appeared alongside actor Matthew Lewis in the promo video for A Band of Buriers' 'Filth' directed by Blake Claridge.

On 16 October 2012, it was confirmed that Loveless would reprise the role of Naomi Campbell in the seventh and final series of Skins.

In 2013, Loveless was awarded 'Best Newcomer' at the Monaco International Film Festival for her portrayal as Alexia in Kate Lane's Fear of Water

August 2016 saw Loveless' debut on the London stage, starring in The Collector at The Vaults theatre with Daniel Portman. Although the play itself received mixed reviews, Loveless' performance received positive reviews.

In 2019, Loveless played Ingrid Prisby in Netflix mystery thriller The Stranger.

Filmography

Theatre

Personal life
Loveless attended Millfields Community Primary School and Cardinal Pole Roman Catholic School, both situated in Hackney, East London.  She revealed to NME that her favourite bands are English rock group Arctic Monkeys and the Red Hot Chili Peppers. She also said that she likes music from artists such as Florence and the Machine because it is theatrical and when she listens to music she pictures scenes in films that the music could relate to. She also plays the piano.

References

External links 
 

1990 births
Living people
English television actresses
Actresses from London
People from Weybridge
Actresses from Surrey
21st-century English actresses